Major-General Richard Lewis Clutterbuck  (22 November 1917 – 6 January 1998) was a British Army officer who later became a pioneer in the study of political violence.

Career 
Clutterbuck was commissioned into the Royal Engineers in 1937 after graduating in mechanical sciences from Pembroke College, Cambridge. After Dunkirk, he went through both the Western Desert and Italian campaigns. The army sent Clutterbuck to different hotspots, including Palestine (1947) during the Irgun Zvei Leumi's terrorist campaign. In 1956, up against Chinese communists, Clutterbuck shed his rank badges to go on patrol as an ordinary soldier. As chief engineer Far East, 1966–68, Brigadier Clutterbuck put into practice in northeast Thailand the counter-terrorist philosophy he was gradually evolving. His next job after Thailand was as Engineer-in-Chief (1968–70) at the Ministry of Defence. While in the Far East he had started to read for a PhD in politics. In 1968, he enrolled at the University of London.

His last army post was back in the specialisation he had created for himself, as chief army instructor of the Royal College of Defence Studies, devoted to peacekeeping or "low-intensity operations" as they were now termed. His Who's Who entry gave his recreations as "sailing, canoeing and the study of revolution". On retirement in 1972 he received his PhD, and becamef lecturer in political conflict at the University of Exeter.

Nicholas Shakespeare reports that Clutterbuck's secret visits to Lima, Peru in the early 1990s transformed police and army operations against the Sendero Luminoso when the organisation appeared on the verge of overthrowing the government. His advice that a forensic rather than militaristic approach be taken to counter-terrorist operations was successfully applied by police chiefs such as General Antonio Ketin Vidal and led directly to the arrest of Abimael Guzman, leader of the Senderistas, and the winding up of his organisation.

Publications

Across the River (as Richard Jocelyn), 1957;
The Long Long War, 1966; 
Protest and the Urban Guerrilla, 1973; 
Riot and Revolution in Singapore and Malaya, 1973; 
Living with Terrorism, 1975; 
Guerrillas and Terrorists, 1977;
Britain in Agony, 1978, (revised edition 1980); 
Kidnap and Ransom, 1978; 
The Media and Political Violence, 1981, (revised edition 1983); 
Industrial Conflict and Democracy, 1984; 
Conflict and Violence in Singapore and Malaysia, 1985; 
The Future of Political Violence, 1986; 
Kidnap, Hijack and Extortion, 1987; 
Terrorism and Guerrilla Warfare, 1990; 
Terrorism, Drugs and Crime in Europe after 1992, 1990; 
International Crisis and Conflict, 1993; 
Terrorism in an Unstable World, 1994; 
Drugs, Crime and Corruption, 1995, 
Public Safety and Civil Liberties, 1997
Families, Drugs and Crime, 1998 (published posthumously)

References

External links
 The Papers of Major General Clutterbuck at Churchill Archives Centre, Cambridge

1917 births
1998 deaths
Alumni of the University of London
Royal Engineers officers
British Army personnel of World War II
British Army major generals
People educated at Radley College
Alumni of Pembroke College, Cambridge
Academics of the University of Exeter
British political scientists
Companions of the Order of the Bath
Officers of the Order of the British Empire
20th-century political scientists